Best Bits is a compilation album released by Roger Daltrey released in March 1982 in United States and under the title The Best of Roger Daltrey in Europe in 1981.  It was released on MCA 5301, Canada, and the album reached #185 in the U.S. charts.  The tracks "Martyrs and Madmen" and "Treachery" were previously unreleased.  The compilation and additional remixing were done by Jon Astley and Phil Chapman.

Track listing 

 "Martyrs and Madmen"  (Steve Swindells)
 "Say It Ain't So, Joe"  (Murray Head)
 "Oceans Away"  (Goodhand-Tait)
 "Treachery"  (Swindells)
 "Free Me"  (Russ Ballard)
 "Without Your Love"  (Billy Nicholls)
 "Hard Life"
 "Giving it All Away"  (David Courtney, Leo Sayer)
 "Avenging Annie"  (Andy Pratt)
 "Proud"  (Ballard)
 "You Put Something Better Inside Me"

Song chart positions 

 "Giving it All Away" (#5 UK), 1973
 "Without Your Love" (#20 US), 1980
 "Free Me" (#39 UK), 1980

See also
Roger Daltrey discography

References 

Roger Daltrey compilation albums
Albums produced by Jon Astley
1981 greatest hits albums
1982 greatest hits albums
MCA Records compilation albums